Hernán Ricardo Aguirre Calpa (born 13 December 1995 in Guachucal) is a Colombian cyclist, who currently rides for UCI Continental team . He was named in the startlist for the 2017 Vuelta a España.

Major results

2013
 1st Overall Vuelta a Colombia Juniors
1st Stage 2
2015
 9th Overall Vuelta a Colombia
1st  Young rider classification 
2016
 3rd Overall Vuelta a Colombia Under–23
1st Stage 7
 6th Overall Giro della Valle d'Aosta
 10th Overall Tour Alsace
2017
 8th Overall Vuelta a la Comunidad de Madrid
 9th Overall Vuelta a Asturias
1st  Young rider classification
2018
 1st  Overall Tour of Qinghai Lake
1st  Mountains classification
1st Stages 4 & 6
 9th Overall Vuelta a Aragón
1st  Young rider classification
2019
 Tour of Qinghai Lake
1st  Mountains classification
1st Stage 4
 4th Overall Tour of Rwanda
 4th Overall Tour de Langkawi
2020
 8th Overall Tour Colombia

Grand Tour general classification results timeline

References

External links

1995 births
Living people
Colombian male cyclists
Sportspeople from Nariño Department
21st-century Colombian people